Union Township is one of sixteen townships in Cass County, Iowa, USA.  As of the 2000 census, its population was 495.

Geography
According to the USGS, it contains one cemetery, Greenwood.

References

External links
 US-Counties.com
 City-Data.com

Townships in Cass County, Iowa
Townships in Iowa